Daniel Kahn & the Painted Bird is a German klezmer band founded by Jewish-American singer-songwriter and actor Daniel Kahn, originally from Detroit, Michigan. The band was formed in 2005 and is based in Berlin. They have released five albums through German world music label . The name of the band comes from the title of the novel The Painted Bird by Jerzy Kosiński.

History 
Daniel Kahn was born on September 11, 1978, in Detroit, Michigan. He attended the University of Michigan, where he studied Theater, Playwriting, Poetry and Politics. After graduating, Daniel moved to New Orleans where he was first introduced to modern Jewish music. He then went on to live and perform in Detroit, New York and Michigan.

Musical style 
The group describes their music as "a mixture of Klezmer, radical Yiddish song, political cabaret and folk punk", and it has been compared to the music of Tom Waits and Woody Guthrie.

Some of the songs are written by Kahn, but many are adaptations of poems and songs by Jewish authors such as Mordechaj Gebirtig, frequently with socio-political themes. In 2016 he translated Leonard Cohen's "Hallelujah" into Yiddish, which he has occasionally sung at concerts since then. 

He sings in English, German and Yiddish, often mixing several languages in one song. Translating lyrics has been an interest and source of inspiration. The Painted Birds have previously collaborated with Russian singing Vanya Zhuk as well as Michael Winograd, Paul Brody and Dan Blacksberg.

Discography 
 The Broken Tongue (Chasma Records, 2006; re-released Oriente Musik, 2009)
 Partisans & Parasites (Oriente Musik, 2009)
 Lost Causes (Oriente Musik, 2010)
 Bad Old Songs (Oriente Musik, 2012)
 The Butcher's Share (Oriente Musik, 2017)
 Bulat Blues (Oriente Musik, 2019)
 The Third Unternational (Oriente Musik, 2020)
 The Fourth Unternational (Oriente Musik, 2020)
Word Beggar (Oriente Musik, 2021)

Citations and References

External links 

 Video: Interview with Daniel Kahn

Klezmer groups
2005 establishments in the United States
Musical groups established in 2005
Musical groups from Berlin
Yiddish-language music
Yiddish-language singers
Folk punk groups